Bill Cameron was an Australian former professional rugby league footballer who played in the 1910s and 1920s. He played for the South Sydney and Eastern Suburbs  in the New South Wales Rugby League (NSWRL) competition.

Playing career
Cameron made his first grade debut for South Sydney in round 2 of the 1917 NSWRL season against Annandale at Wentworth Park. In 1920, Cameron joined arch-rivals Eastern Suburbs. Cameron spent two seasons at Eastern Suburbs before returning to South Sydney. Cameron spent two final years at South Sydney with his final game for the club being a 28-5 loss against St. George in round 8 of the 1923 NSWRL season.

References

Sydney Roosters players
South Sydney Rabbitohs players
Australian rugby league players
Rugby league props
Rugby league second-rows